The Voice of Poland (season 3) began airing 7 September 2013 on TVP 2.

Mateusz Ziółko won the competition on November 30, 2013, marking Maria Sadowska's first win as a coach, and the first stolen artist to win The Voice of Poland.

Hosts and coaches

It was announced that Justyna Steczkowska will not return because of her pregnancy and work commitments. After her resignation rumors had been circulating that Doda may replace her. However, this information has been soon debunked by TVP. Ewa Farna, Monika Brodka, Edyta Górniak and Maria Peszek were said to join the show. On 2 July 2013, Maria Peszek confirmed that she had received a proposition from the production team, but she hadn't accepted it. Anita Lipnicka, Renata Przemyk, Anna Wyszkoni, Kasia Kowalska, Kasia Nosowska, Urszula, Maria Sadowska and Anna Maria Jopek were also said to be in the running for the role. Tomson & Baron from Afromental and Marek Piekarczyk were expected to return for the next series. On 22 July 2013, Patrycja Markowska announced she would be leaving the show to concentrate on her career.

After weeks of speculations, on 29 July 2013, Marek Piekarczyk, Tomson & Baron, Maria Sadowska and Edyta Górniak were revealed as the judging panel. All hosts from the previous season were said to return. However, Iga Krefft did not return as a V-Reporter.

Auditions
Auditions took place on 8 June, 22 June and 15 July 2013 in Warsaw.

Teams
Color key

Blind auditions
The blind auditions took place from 11 to 14 August 2013.

Color keys

Episode 1 (September 7, 2013)

Episode 2 (September 7, 2013)

Episode 3 (September 14, 2013)

Episode 4 (September 14, 2013)

Episode 5 (September 21, 2013)

Episode 6 (September 21, 2013)

Episode 7 (September 28, 2013)

Episode 8 (September 28, 2013)

Episode 9 (October 5, 2013)

Episode 10 (October 5, 2013)

The Battle Rounds
The Battle Rounds will take place from 9 to 11 September 2013.  In this season each coach can steal two contestants from another team.

Color keys

The Knockouts
Before each knockout round the coach chooses two artists from their team to get a "fast pass" to the live shows, the remaining six artists from that team are then split up into two groups of three. At the end of each knockout round the coach then decides out of the three artists who wins, and therefore makes up their four artists to take to the live shows.

Episode 14 (November 2, 2013)
Color keys

Live Shows

Color keys

Episode 15 (November 9, 2013)

Quarterfinal (November 16, 2013)

Semifinal (November 23, 2013)

Final (November 30, 2013)

Results summary of live shows
Color keys
Artist's info

Result details

Contestants' appearances on earlier talent shows
Natalia Krakowiak and Estera Wrona appeared on children's talent show Od przedszkola do Opola.
Nella Marczewski was a contestant on the second and third season of X Factor. She failed to get through the Bootcamp stage both seasons.
Michał Grobelny reached the semifinals on the third season of Mam talent!.
Małgorzata Nakonieczna sang in the blind auditions of season two of The Voice of Poland and failed to make a team, but was able to turn chairs this season.
Joanna Smajdor, along with Katarzyna Kowalczuk, performed in season two of Mam talent!. They were eliminated in semifinal.
Monika Wiśniowska competed on the fourth season of Idol. She advanced to the semifinals.
Mateusz Ziółko reached the final on the first season of Mam talent!. Later, he was a semifinalist on season four of Must Be the Music. Tylko muzyka.
Monika Wiśniowska and Łukasz Szuba are part of a group Soul City which had competed on the second season of X Factor. They placed fifth.
Aleksandra Pieczara sang in the blind auditions of season one of The Voice of Poland and joined Ania Dąbrowska's team. She was eliminated in the Sing-off stage, right before the live shows.
Patryk Komosa and Magdalena Meisel made it to the Bootcamp stage on X Factor season two.
Ida Zalewska and Paweł Zieliński appeared on Droga do Gwiazd seasons three and four respectively.
Dorota Theisebach, Joanna Smajdor, Joanna Kaszta, Magdalena Meisel and Kaja Tyzenhauz were contestants on first season of Bitwa na głosy.
Estera Wrona, Rafał Sekulak, Dorota Lembicz and Kacper Andrzejewski appeared on second season of Bitwa na głosy. 
Barbara Gąsienica-Giewont, Małgorzata Nakonieczna, Patrycja Michalska, Magdalena Banasiuk, Patryk Komosa and Krzysztof Spychała appeared on third season of Bitwa na głosy.
Many of the contestants sang in Szansa na sukces.

References

The Voice of Poland
2013 Polish television seasons